The Deep Blue Sea is a 1955 British drama film directed by Anatole Litvak, starring Vivien Leigh and Kenneth More, and produced by London Films and released by Twentieth Century Fox. The picture was based on the 1952 play of the same name by Terence Rattigan. 

Currently unavailable on DVD, the film was given a rare screening as part of the BFI Vivien Leigh Season in 2013, introduced by Sean O'Connor, producer of the 2011 version of the film by Terence Davies.

Premise
The movie tells the story of a woman unhappy in her passionless marriage leaving her husband for a younger and more ardent lover.

Cast

Production
The play had been very successful and a number of companies expressed interest in obtaining the film rights. Alexander Korda offered £40,000 plus £10,000 to write the screenplay. He intended for Anatole Litvak to direct and Olivia de Havilland to star as Hesther. However negotiations stalled when 20th Century Fox refused to let Litvak direct the film. 

Some time later Korda approached Rattigan and again and he bought the screen rights for £7,500 plus £4,000 to Rattigan to write the script. Korda wanted Vivien Leigh to play Hesther, Kenneth More to play Freddie, and Charles Boyer to play Mr Miller, but said Leigh would not accept Rattigan's preferred director, Anthony Asquith. Rattigan started working on the script after the premiere of Separate Tables. Korda sold the project on to 20th Century Fox, which made him an instant profit. Fox insisted the film be directed by Anatole Litvak, and that it be in colour and CinemaScope. Boyer turned down the part of Mr Miller so Eric Portman was cast. Litvak's influence meant Rattigan "opened up" the story incorporating scenes such as Freddie and Hesther in a ski resort, and Freddie testing planes. 

Kenneth More was the only key member of the original cast (who had also appeared in a BBC Television version in 1954) to be hired for the film, as Alexander Korda wanted to use names that were more recognisable to movie goers. (More had just been put under contract to Korda.) More always felt this was a mistake, particularly the casting of Vivien Leigh rather than Peggy Ashcroft. He later wrote:
The casting of the beautiful Vivien Leigh was absurd. She was supposed to be an outwardly ordinary but secretly highly-sexed woman who meets a young pilot on the golf course and falls for him. My first lines on meeting her were to say: ‘My God, Hes, you’re beautiful.’ She had never been told this before —- and understandably it had a remarkable effect on her. But when the part is played by a woman generally held to be one of the most beautiful in the world, the whole meaning is lost.
More did not enjoy filming, feeling that the use of CinemaScope and changes made to the original play detracted from the intimacy of the story. He also felt he had poor chemistry with Leigh. "We were never in complete accord," wrote More. "I thought her interpretation was wrong, and so when we played a scene together we had the wrong chemistry between us."

Reception
The film was a box office disappointment in the US. "It was a tricky subject for American audiences", said More.

Awards
1956 Kenneth More was nominated for the BAFTA Awards' Best British Actor
1956 Terence Rattigan was nominated for the BAFTA Awards' Best British Screenplay
1955 Kenneth More won the Venice Film Festival "Volpi Cup" Best Actor award
1955 Anatole Litvak was nominated for the Venice Film Festival "Golden Lion"

See also
List of American films of 1955

References

External links
 
 
 

1955 films
1955 drama films
20th Century Fox films
CinemaScope films
1950s English-language films
British films based on plays
Films directed by Anatole Litvak
London Films films
Films based on works by Terence Rattigan
Films set in London
British drama films
Films with screenplays by Terence Rattigan
Films produced by Alexander Korda
1950s British films